Nosso Amor Rebelde (English: Our Rebel Love) is the second Portuguese language studio album by Mexican pop group RBD, released only in Brazil on May 22, 2006. The album contains 11 songs translated to Portuguese from RBD's successful second Spanish studio album, Nuestro Amor.

Background 
With the success of the first two seasons of the telenovela Rebelde (broadcast through SBT in Brazil between 2005 and 2006) and the good sales of RBD's albums in Brazil (mainly those of Rebelde (Edição Brasil), the Portuguese language version of the group's first studio album), RBD's production team decided to start producing a Brazilian version of the album Nuestro Amor to support the broadcast of the third season of the telenovela (starring the group) in the country.

Recording and production
All of the members of RBD took turns between recording the album in the recording studio and filming the telenovela Rebelde. The first songs to be recorded were "Nosso Amor" and "Venha de Novo O Amor", so as to be used as part of the telenovela's soundtrack, which was being broadcast by SBT.

The album's production was entirely supervised by the band's executive producer: Pedro Damián. The original Spanish lyrics in Nuestro Amor were translated and adapted to Portuguese by Cláudio Rabello.

Promo singles 
Four singles were released in Brazil to promote the album. The first was the album's title track, "Nosso Amor". The second single, released in July 2006, was "Venha de Novo O Amor", while the third single, "Atrás de Mim", was released in September 2006. The album's last single was released in October 2006 and was titled "Esse Coração".

Release 
The album was released on May 22, 2006, and has sold 750,000 copies in Brazil.

Track listing 

 Notes
"Feliz Aniversário" is the Portuguese version of Mikeyla's "Happy Worst Day".
"Me Voy" is the Spanish cover version of Kelly Clarkson's "Gone", originally released on Clarkson's Multi-Platinum album Breakaway (2004).

Translated songs
The tracks that were translated and recorded in Portuguese from their original Spanish language versions in Nuestro Amor (2005) are:
 "Nosso Amor" ("Nuestro Amor")
 "Feliz Aniversário" ("Feliz Cumpleaños")
 "Esse Coração" ("Este Corazón")
 "Venha de Novo O Amor" ("Aún Hay Algo")
 "Ao Seu Lado" ("A Tu Lado")
 "Fora" ("Fuera")
 "O Que Houve Com O Amor?" ("¿Qué Fue Del Amor?")
 "O Que Há Por Trás?" ("¿Qué Hay Detrás?")
 "Atrás de Mim" ("Tras De Mí")
 "Só Para Você" ("Solo Para Ti")
 "Uma Canção" ("Una Canción")

Charts and certifications 
The album was certified 2× Platinum in Brazil. It was the 14th best-selling album of 2006 in Brazil according to the ABPD.

Weekly charts

Year-end charts

Certifications and sales

Release history

Notes 

RBD albums
2006 albums